Escola da Cidade (lit. City School) is a private, not-for-profit institution of higher learning in São Paulo, Brazil. Established in 2001, it offers bachelor's degree and postgraduate programs in architecture and urban planning, as well as non-degree courses in architecture, urbanism, design, and related disciplines. Since March 2020, the School has also operated Fábrica • Escola de Humanidades João Filgueiras Lima (FAEH), a private secondary and vocational school with a focus on the humanities and maker culture.

The School has no formal rector or dean system; it is operated by Associação Escola da Cidade, a nonprofit association of architects, fine artists, and public intellectuals, and managed by five boards. Noted faculty members include Marcio Kogan and Paulo von Poser.

The campus is entirely urban and occupies two buildings in the Vila Buarque neighborhood of central São Paulo, originally designed in the 1940s as apartment blocks by Oswaldo Bratke.

In addition to a regular library open to the general public (Biblioteca Vilanova Artigas) and a university press (Editora da Cidade), the School also operates Baú, a "student-run... audiovisual repository of all knowledge produced at Escola da Cidade". All content is freely available online.

Partner institutions
The undergraduate curriculum for first-year through fourth-year students includes one mandatory overseas trip per semester, in a program known as Escola Itinerante (Itinerant School). Partner institutions include the University of Buenos Aires, California College of the Arts, London Metropolitan University School of Art, Architecture and Design, École nationale supérieure d'architecture de Paris-La Villette, and Polytechnic University of Milan.

The School also offers an academic exchange program for visiting scholars.

Accreditation
The School's only degree-granting program, the six-year Bachelor of Architecture and Urban Planning, has been fully accredited by the Brazilian Ministry of Education and Culture since 2001. Eight postgraduate programs, all lato sensu, are likewise accredited.

See also
List of architecture schools in Brazil

References

External links
Official website

Architecture schools in Brazil
Private universities and colleges in Brazil